During the 2020–21 season, Jong Ajax participated in the Dutch Eerste Divisie, the 2nd tier of professional football in the Netherlands.  It was their 8th consecutive season in the Eerste Divisie.

Squad

Transfers
For a list of all Dutch football transfers in the summer window (1 July 2020 to 31 August 2020) please see List of Dutch football transfers summer 2020. For a list of all Dutch football transfers in the winter window (1 January 2021 to 1 February 2021) please see List of Dutch football transfers winter 2020–21.

Summer

In:

Out:

Winter

In:

Out:

Pre-season and friendlies

Competitions

Eerste Divisie

League table

Period 1

Period 2

Period 3

Period 4

Results summary

Results by round

Matches

Statistics

Appearances and goals
{| class="wikitable sortable" style="text-align:center"
|-
!rowspan="2" style="background:white; color:#c0042d;" |
!rowspan="2" style="background:white; color:#c0042d;" |
!rowspan="2" style="background:white; color:#c0042d;" |
!rowspan="2" style="background:white; color:#c0042d;" |Name
!colspan="2" style="background:white; color:#c0042d;" |Total
!colspan="2" style="background:white; color:#c0042d;" |Eerste Divisie
!colspan="3" style="background:white; color:#c0042d;" |Discipline
|-
!Apps
!Goals
!Apps
!Goals
!width=30 |
!width=30 |
!width=30 |
|-
||7||1||0
||0||0||0
||3||1||0
||3||0||0
||0||0||0
||0||0||0
||0||0||0
||3||0||1
||2||0||0
||6||0||0
||0||0||0
||5||0||0
||0||0||0
||0||1||0
||2||0||0
||3||0||0
||2||0||0
||0||0||0
||2||0||0
|-
|colspan="14"|First team players who have made appearances for reserve squad:
|-
||0||0||0
||1||0||0
||0||0||0
||0||0||0
||1||0||0
|-
|colspan="14"|Youth players who have made appearances for reserve squad:
|-
||0||0||0
||1||0||0
||5||0||0
||0||0||0
||0||0||0
||3||1||0
||0||0||0
||0||0||0
||0||0||0
||0||0||0
||2||0||0
|-
|colspan="14"|Players sold or loaned out after the start of the season:
|-
||0||0||1
||0||0||1

Clean sheets

References

External links

Jong Ajax seasons
Jong Ajax